Clearwater Marine Aquarium is a 501(c)(3) non-profit organization, and aquarium in Clearwater, Florida. It is dedicated to the rescue, rehabilitation and release of sick and injured marine animals, public education, conservation, and research.

Clearwater Marine Aquarium opened in 1972 at its current location on Clearwater Beach, in a former water treatment plant (the large pools being well-suited for rehabilitation operations).

Numerous forms of marine life are permanent residents at the aquarium, all of which have serious injuries that prevent their return to the wild.

The aquarium's best-known permanent resident was Winter, a bottlenose dolphin who was rescued in December 2005 after having her tail caught in a crab trap.  Her injuries caused the loss of her tail, and the aquarium fitted her with a prosthetic tail which brought worldwide attention to the facility. Winter later starred in the 2011 film, Dolphin Tale, and the sequel, Dolphin Tale 2, shot partially on location at the aquarium.

History
In 1972, a group of private volunteers decided it was time to establish a permanent marine biology learning center in the Clearwater area. They were incorporated as a 501(c)(3) nonprofit organization under the name Clearwater Marine Science Center (CMSC). In 1978, the city of Clearwater agreed to donate the aquarium's current facility, an abandoned water treatment plant, to CMSC. With its huge holding pools and bayside location, the building was a perfect fit for a marine facility's needs. In 1979, marine biologist Dennis Kellenberger was hired as CMSC's Executive Director. Kellenberger's main duties were teaching summer camp classes for children and spearheading a massive remodeling effort of the facility.

Gradually, the cement and steel building was modified for aquarium purposes and in 1980 was granted a USDA Research Facility permit, allowing it to prepare two 65,000 gallon pools for the rehabilitation of dolphins and sea turtles. In 1981, the first exhibit room was opened to the public. The room featured old exhibits from the Sea-Orama, a mounted fish exhibit which was formerly on display at the Clearwater Marina. Over the next few years, thanks to individual and corporate donations and immense volunteer efforts, CMSC continued to grow. In 1984, CMSC rescued a stranded Atlantic bottlenose dolphin named "Sunset Sam." This was the first dolphin in Florida to survive a beaching. However, due to chronic liver problems, Sunset could not be released into the wild and became CMSC's first resident dolphin. Sunset Sam was taught how to paint as a form of animal enrichment, and the sales of his paintings were used to fund the CMSC's operations and stranding program.

In the 1990s, as renovations continued to provide more public area and education programs, the facility's name was changed to Clearwater Marine Aquarium (CMA) to reflect the increasing level of community interaction. In 2005, CMA's most famous permanent resident, a bottlenose dolphin named Winter, was rescued by CMA after being discovered entangled in the ropes of a crab trap. The ropes cut off the blood supply to the dolphin's tail, and resulted in its loss. To give Winter the ability to swim normally, CMA worked with a team of experts to create a prosthetic silicone and plastic tail for her. Winter's story brought international recognition to CMA and inspired two major films, Dolphin Tale and Dolphin Tale 2, each of which was partially filmed at the aquarium.

Animals
Clearwater Marine Aquarium currently is home to North American river otters, Atlantic bottlenose dolphins, Rough-toothed dolphins, green sea turtles, Kemp's ridley sea turtles, cownose rays, southern stingrays, nurse sharks, great white pelicans, and other fish, including gag, hogfish, and red drum. Each permanent resident was deemed non-releasable by National Marine Fisheries and unable to return to the wild due to injuries or other impairments. Once deemed non-releasable, National Marine Fisheries then selected CMA as the best location for their permanent home due to the staff and facilities CMA is able to provide.

Dolphins (bottlenose dolphins and rough toothed dolphins)

Winter

Winter, the most famous aquarium resident, was a female Atlantic bottlenose dolphin who was rescued in 2005 by Clearwater Marine Aquarium team members and other partners from the Southeast Standing Network after being found caught in a crab trap. She lost her tail due to her injuries. Winter developed a way to swim without a tail in an unnatural side to side motion, but because this was damaging her spinal cord, a prosthetic tail was made especially for her by Kevin Carroll and a team of experts from Hanger, Inc. Winter starred in the 2011 movie Dolphin Tale and the 2014 sequel Dolphin Tale 2, which was inspired by her story and the sequel inspired on Hope's story. She resided in the Ruth & J.O Stone Dolphin Complex with other bottlenose dolphins Hope, PJ, Nicholas and Hemingway. On November 11, 2021, Winter died at the age of 16.

Hope
 
Hope is a resident dolphin at CMA. In December 2010, she was discovered in the shallows of Indian River Lagoon as an orphaned 2-month-old calf, still attempting to nurse from her mother, who had died after becoming beached. It was ultimately determined that Hope did not make a good candidate for release because she was very young and had not learned the necessary survival skills to be out in the wild. Hope currently resides in the same area as Winter, and co-starred in Dolphin Tale 2, a sequel to the original movie which dramatized her rescue.

Nicholas
Nicholas is an Atlantic bottlenose dolphin. For many years, he was the only male dolphin currently residing at CMA. On December 24, 2002, he was rescued with his mother as a 6-month-old calf after both became stranded near Gibsonton, Florida. The mother dolphin died three days later due to respiratory illness. Nicholas remained in critical condition, suffering both from malnourishment and severe sunburns which covered over thirty percent of his body. CMA provided 24-hour care for Nicholas for several months, bottlefeeding him and providing wound care. Nicholas was eventually weaned by the animal care staff at CMA, and his wounds completely healed.

Like Hope, it was determined that Nicholas did not make a suitable candidate for release because of his dependent status at the time of his stranding and rehabilitation. He lacks the necessary survival skills, which he could only learn from his mother, to survive in the wild. Nicholas lives in the Ruth & J.O. Stone Dolphin Complex with other bottlenose dolphins Hemingway, Winter (deceased), Hope, and PJ. Nicholas featured briefly in the movie Dolphin Tale, playing a female dolphin alongside Panama named Christa. He appears in Dolphin Tale 2, portraying Mandy. He is known for his ability to select the winners of sports match-ups which is part of his enrichment.

PJ
PJ (short for Panama Junior, because she has the same hearing problem as former resident Panama) was a female Atlantic bottlenose dolphin who was rescued in August 2018. At approximately 51 years old, she was the oldest of the rescued dolphins at CMA. PJ was found in shallow water in Old Tampa Bay. Although she recovered well, she was deemed unreleasable due to numerous medical issues, including hearing and vision loss, worn teeth, and arthritis. She lived together with Hope. In October 2022 PJ died of natural causes at the age of 51.

Hemingway
Hemingway is a male Atlantic bottlenose dolphin who was found stranded at Fiesta Key, Florida in 2019. After receiving treatment at SeaWorld, he was transferred to the Clearwater Marine Aquarium. Hemingway, who is estimated to be 26 years old, became a permanent resident at CMA due to health issues and hearing loss.

Apollo
Apollo is a male Atlantic bottlenose dolphin who was found stranded at Playalinda, Florida in May 2021. He was transported to SeaWorld for rehabilitation because he was thin and had parasites on his dorsal fin, pectoral fins, and fluke at the time of his rescue. During a hearing test administered by the National Marine Mammal Foundation, it was discovered that Apollo suffered from hearing loss. In December 2021, he was transferred to the Clearwater Marine Aquarium and became a permanent resident there. At approximately 2 years old, he is currently the youngest of the rescued dolphins at CMA.

Rex and Rudolph
Rex and Rudolph are the aquarium's first rough-toothed dolphins. Rudolph is a juvenile male who stranded off Sanibel Island in late 2019. He became a permanent resident because he did not have the hearing range required for echolocation. Rex was discovered on St. George Island in April 2019; he is about 5–7 years old. Because of significant hearing loss, Rex eventually became a permanent resident at the Clearwater Marine Aquarium.

Izzy
Izzy is Clearwater Marine Aquariums' newest dolphin resident as of November 2022. Estimated to be 5 years old, she was rescued in June 2022 in Texas, after several years of illegal human interactions, which caused her health to decline, and needing to be taken out of the wild. On November 4th, 2022, she arrived at Clearwater Marine Aquarium and started to settle in.

Sharks
The aquarium is home to one fully-grown nurse shark, Thelma. A private collector illegally took the shark out of the wild as a young pup. When Thelma outgrew her tank, the collector could no longer care for her and donated Thelma to CMA. At the aquarium, she shares an exhibit with hogfish, red drum, gag grouper, mangrove snapper, black sea bass, common snook, pinfish, red grouper, lookdown, and white grunt.

Sea turtles
Clearwater Marine Aquarium currently has one loggerhead, seven green sea turtles, and three Kemp's ridley sea turtles.  Many of them were rescued by CMA after being hit by boats, entangled in fishing line, or sustaining other permanent injuries that prevent their return to the wild. They permanently reside in the "Turtle Cove", "Turtle Bayou", and "Mavis's Hideaway" exhibits.

North American river otters
The aquarium currently has two North American river otters.  Walle was rescued from the wild as an orphaned pup by a private individual, and was transferred to CMA after becoming too dependent on humans.  He currently resides in the Otter Oasis exhibit at Clearwater Marine Aquarium. Walle has a new friend Boomer who has come to the Aquarium to be his best friend and keep him company.

Pelicans
Four great white pelicans, currently reside at the aquarium Ricky, Tyndall, Skylar and Matthew. They are the only aquarium residents that are not native to Florida. Ricky was trained by a film company to play the role of "Rufus" for the films Dolphin Tale and Dolphin Tale 2.

Rays
Twelve cownose rays and two southern stingrays currently reside in the Stingray Beach and Touch Tank exhibits, where they can be touched and fed by aquarium visitors.

Expansion
Clearwater Marine Aquarium's expansion allows for the rescue and rehabilitation of more marine life, creates an enhanced living habitat for the resident non-releasable animals, and provide more space for guests. This enhanced, more natural habitat is home to non-releasable dolphins Winter, Hope, PJ, Nicholas, and Hemingway. New expanded education areas with total new guest space of 103,000 sq feet, including a new cafe and retail area. CMA is currently researching the ways in which it can utilize the adjacent waterway for rescue and rehabilitation work. There is a new parking garage consisting of 400 parking spots. The new expansions were opened in October 2020. There is another expansion coming to Clearwater Marine Aquarium soon which is a manatee rehab site, this change is supposed to happen in the next 3 years.

References
Notes

Sources
"Sea turtle restored to health at Clearwater aquarium released back in Gulf"
"Clearwater Marine Aquarium gets $50M project under way"
"City leaders host groundbreaking expansion for Clearwater Marine Aquarium"
Aquarium 2012 Annual Report

External links

External links

Aquaria in Florida
Buildings and structures in Clearwater, Florida
Dolphinariums
Marine conservation organizations
Non-profit organizations based in Florida
Educational institutions established in 1972
Environmental organizations established in 1972
Zoos established in 1972
1972 establishments in Florida
Tourist attractions in Pinellas County, Florida